is the sixth single by Japanese pop singer Yuki Saito. It was ranked #6 on the Oricon charts.

History
"Doyōbi no Tamanegi" was released on May 21, 1986 as a 12-inch single vinyl record through Canyon Records. The single reached #6 on the Oricon charts.

The B-side release was "Axia - Kanashii Kotori". The title song had lyrics written by Hiroko Taniyama, the music was composed by Toshio Kamei and was arranged by Satoshi Takebe. Natsuo Giniro wrote the lyrics and composed the music for the B-side, and Takebe arranged the music.

The original single sold 320,000 copies initially, and a total of 880,000 copies. It was later rereleased as a mini CD single on April 29, 1988.

Chart history

Track listing

Notes

References

1986 singles
Japanese-language songs
Yuki Saito (actress) songs
1986 songs